Pauline Peters (24 August 189514 December 1976) was a Welsh actress in dozens of silent films.

Early life 
Pauline Peters was born in Cardiff.

Selected filmography 
Peters appeared in dozens of silent films, including the "Walter" serials with Walter Forde. She also appeared in one sound picture, her last role, in Deadlock (1931). 
 Home (1915)
 Florence Nightingale (1915)
 Trent's Last Case (1920)
 The Loudwater Mystery (1921)
 Her Penalty (1921)
 In Full Cry (1921)
 The Mayor of Casterbridge (1921)
 Walter Makes a Movie (1922)
 The Lilac Sunbonnet (1922)
 The Missioner (1922)
 Deadlock (1931)

Personal life 
Peters married English film producer and actor A. George Smith. She died in South Africa in 1976, at the age of 81.

References

External links

The Mayor of Casterbridge (1921), co-starring Pauilne Peters, on YouTube

1895 births
1976 deaths
Welsh film actresses
Welsh silent film actresses
Actresses from Cardiff
20th-century Welsh actresses